Burn, Berlin, Burn! is a compilation album released by Atari Teenage Riot in 1997.  Initially released in the United States by the Beastie Boys' record label Grand Royal (Mike D was quoted saying the music is "the most punk-rock shit ever" ), the album is a collection of tracks from their first two albums Delete Yourself! and The Future of War.  After Grand Royal Records went defunct, the album was later remastered and re-released on Digital Hardcore Recordings.

Track listing 
All tracks by Alec Empire

 "Start the Riot" – 3:38
 "Fuck All!" – 3:08
 "Sick to Death" – 3:40
 "P.R.E.S.S." – 4:19
 "Deutschland (Has Gotta Die!)" – 3:02
 "Destroy 2000 Years of Culture" – 3:51
 "Not Your Business" – 2:32
 "Heatwave" – 2:43
 "Atari Teenage Riot" – 3:35
 "Delete Yourself" – 4:30
 "Into the Death" – 3:26
 "Death Star" – 5:23
 "Speed" – 2:48
 "The Future of War" – 3:44
Tracks 1, 9, 10, 11, 13 from Delete Yourself!. Tracks 2–8, 12, 14 from The Future of War.

Personnel 

 Alec Empire – Producer
 Philipp Virus – Animation

Notes

External links 
 Official Digital Hardcore Recordings website
 Burn, Berlin, Burn! CD at Discogs
 Burn, Berlin, Burn! 2x12" at Discogs
 Burn, Berlin, Burn! CD DHR reissue at Discogs

Atari Teenage Riot albums
1997 compilation albums
Grand Royal compilation albums